A Teacher is an American drama television miniseries created by Hannah Fidell based on her film of the same name. The series stars Kate Mara and Nick Robinson. It is produced by FX and premiered on sister streaming service Hulu on November 10, 2020. Critical reception to the miniseries was generally positive. The characterization of the two leads, performances, pacing, and expansion over the original were largely seen as improvements upon the film, while the ending was generally criticized for its rushed nature, lack of closure, and simple handling of complex issues.

Premise
Set from 2013 to 2014, A Teacher focuses on Claire Wilson, an English teacher at the fictional Westerbrook high school in Austin, Texas, who engages in an illicit sexual relationship with her 17-year-old high school student, Eric Walker. The miniseries explores the complexities of the relationship and the consequences for both of them and those around them.

Cast

Main

 Kate Mara as Claire Wilson, a high school English teacher in her early 30s who engages in an illicit affair with one of her students, Eric Walker. 
 Nick Robinson as Eric Walker, a popular high school senior whose sexual relationship with his teacher has lifelong implications. 
 Ashley Zukerman as Matt Mitchell, Claire's husband. 
 Shane Harper as Logan Davis, one of Eric's best friends.
 Marielle Scott as Kathryn Sanders, a French teacher and Claire's newest friend.
 Dylan Schmid as Josh Smith, one of Eric's best friends.
 Adam David Thompson as Nate Wilson, a local police officer and Claire's older brother.
 Jana Peck as Victoria Davis, Logan and Cody's mother who becomes hostile toward Claire once her crime comes to light.

Recurring
 Rya Ingrid Kihlstedt as Sandy Walker, Eric's supportive single mother who works to care for him and his younger brothers. 
 Cameron Moulène as Cody, a frat member and Logan's older brother.
 Camila Perez as Alison Martinez, Eric's ex-girlfriend.
 Ciara Quinn Bravo as Mary Smith, Josh's younger sister.
 Charlie Zeltzer as Phil Walker, one of Eric's younger brothers.
 Matt Raymond as Devin Walker, another of Eric's younger brothers.
 M. C. Gainey as Wyatt Wilson, Claire and Nate's formerly alcoholic father.
Devon Bostick as Ryan, Eric’s college roommate who tries to help him adjust to life in college.

Episodes

Production

Development
In February 2014, it was revealed that Fidell's film A Teacher would be adapted for television by HBO. Fidell would write and executive produce the series along with Danny Brocklehurst. Kate Mara who is starring in the series also be serving as an executive producer, while Fidell will also direct the series, set up at FX instead of HBO. Following the completion of the acquisition of 21st Century Fox by Disney in March 2019, The Walt Disney Company became the majority stakeholders of Hulu and with FX becoming one of the assets acquired through the purchase., it was announced in November 2019 that the show would premiere on Hulu instead of FX, as part of "FX on Hulu". Keegan DeWitt composed the series score.

Casting
In August 2018, it was announced Kate Mara and Nick Robinson were cast in lead roles for the series. In September 2019, Ashley Zukerman, Marielle Scott, Shane Harper, and Adam David Thompson joined the cast as series regulars, while Rya Kihlstedt, Camila Perez, Cameron Moulène and Ciara Bravo joined in recurring roles.

Filming
Principal photography began shooting in Calgary, Alberta, in August 2019. and wrapped on October 13, 2019.

Release
The miniseries premiered on November 10, 2020, with the first 3 episodes available and the rest debuting on a weekly basis on Hulu. It also premiered on BBC Two in the UK on January 3, 2021. Internationally, it is available on Disney+ under the dedicated streaming hub Star as an original series since April 23, 2021, 
and in Latin America the series premiered on August 31, 2021 On Star+.

Reception

Audience viewership 
According to Whip Media, A Teacher was the top rising show, based on the week-over-week growth in episodes watched for a specific program, during the week of November 15, 2020, and the 6th during the week of April 25, 2021. In January 2021, it was reported that A Teacher became FX on Hulu's most-watched series to date, surpassing Mrs. America and Devs.

Critical response 
Review aggregator Rotten Tomatoes reported an approval rating of 73% based on 33 reviews, with an average rating of 6.20/10. The website's critics consensus reads, "Beautiful, but slight, A Teacher attempts to unpack its cautionary tale are admirable, even if its approach is too muted to make a meaningful impact." Metacritic gave the miniseries a weighted average score of 67 out of 100 based on 25 reviews, indicating "generally favorable reviews."

Caroline Framke of Variety praised the performances of Kate Mara and Nick Robinson, complimented how the miniseries explores the consequences of the abuse experienced by Robinson's character across his relationship, and wrote, "A Teacher is an intensive, immersive study of how abuse works and the intimate damage it can wreak."

Emily St. James of Vox wrote that Hannah Fidell succeeds to reimagine and expand the central notion of her film across the miniseries in a thoughtful way, and praised the miniseries for portraying the relationship between the lead characters as wrong and abusive, stating it does not shy away from depicting the negative repercussions of Mara's character on Robinson's.

Liz Shannon Miller of Collider gave the miniseries a grade of A−, applauded the performances of Mara and Robinson, and stated the show succeeds to depict the negative consequences of an abusive relationship, writing, "A Teacher is not a love story. It really has nothing to do with love. But those who find themselves in these situations in real life don't know that, something which A Teacher is trying to capture, and ultimately makes it one of the most daring and complex series of 2020."

Matt Cabral of Common Sense Media rated the miniseries four out of five stars and highlighted the strong sexual content and language, writing, "A Teacher is a mature drama series about an illicit, sexual affair between a high school teacher and her student. The show depicts the predator's grooming of her victim, as well as the ensuing relationship and its fallout. [...] The victim is portrayed as a kind, if flawed, individual who values his relationships with his friends and family."

Kristen Baldwin of Entertainment Weekly gave the miniseries a B, praised the performances of the actors, complimented the chemistry between Mara and Robinson, but criticized the ending of the series, writing, "Television is a medium that allows us to live with characters; instead, A Teacher gives us a highlight reel of psychic convalescence, before ending on a note of oversimplified closure."

Accolades

References

External links
 

2020s American drama television miniseries
2020s American high school television series
2020 American television series debuts
2020 American television series endings
English-language television shows
FX on Hulu original programming
Live action television shows based on films
Television series about educators
Television series about teenagers
Television series by 20th Century Fox Television
Television shows filmed in Calgary
Television shows set in Austin, Texas
Television shows set in Houston